The following is a list of Michigan State Historic Sites in Keweenaw County, Michigan. Sites marked with a dagger (†) are also listed on the National Register of Historic Places in Keweenaw County, Michigan.


Current listings

See also
 National Register of Historic Places listings in Keweenaw County, Michigan

Sources
 Historic Sites Online – Keweenaw County. Michigan State Housing Developmental Authority. Accessed January 23, 2011.

References

Keweenaw County
State Historic Sites
Tourist attractions in Keweenaw County, Michigan